Owain James Jones (born 24 September 1992) is an English former first-class cricketer.

Jones was born at Brighton in September 1992. He was educated at Steyning Grammar School, before going up to St Edmund Hall, Oxford. While studying at Oxford, he played first-class cricket, making his debut for Oxford MCCU against Worcestershire at Oxford in 2012, with Jones appearing in two further matches for Oxford MCCU in 2013 against Warwickshire and Worcestershire. He scored 103 runs for Oxford MCCU, with a high score of 79. In addition to playing for Oxford MCCU, Jones also made three first-class appearances for Oxford University against Cambridge University in The University Matches of 2012, 2015 and 2016. He scored 246 runs at an average of 49.20 in these matches, with a high score of 83. With his right-arm medium pace bowling, he took 10 wickets at a bowling average of 21.80 and best figures of 4 for 70. After graduating from Oxford, he became a schoolmaster at Hurstpierpoint College.

Notes and references

External links

1992 births
Living people
Sportspeople from Brighton
People educated at Steyning Grammar School
Alumni of St Edmund Hall, Oxford
English cricketers
Oxford MCCU cricketers
Oxford University cricketers
Schoolteachers from Sussex